Paraepepeotes gigas is a species of beetle in the family Cerambycidae. It was described by Per Olof Christopher Aurivillius in 1897. It is known from Borneo and Malaysia.

References

Lamiini
Beetles described in 1897